Jiankang (present-day Nanjing) was the capital of the Six Dynasties in imperial China.

Jiankang may also refer to:

Jiankang (144), era name used by Emperor Shun of Han
Jiankang (319–320), era name used by Sima Bao